The 1995–96 UMBC Retrievers men's basketball team represented University of Maryland, Baltimore County in the 1995–96 NCAA Division I men's basketball season. The team played in the Big South Conference (BSC) and led by head coach Tom Sullivan in his first year.

America East Conference standings

References 

UMBC Retrievers men's basketball seasons
UMBC
1995 in sports in Maryland
1996 in sports in Maryland